Wolfgang Ebner (16121665) was a German baroque composer. He was a Viennese court organist in the latter years of the reign of Ferdinand III, Holy Roman Emperor, and then of Leopold I, Holy Roman Emperor.

Ebner was born in Augsburg.  He may have preceded Johann Heinrich Schmelzer as ballet master at the court.  He died in Vienna.

References

German classical composers
German Baroque composers
1612 births
1665 deaths
17th-century classical composers
German male classical composers
17th-century male musicians